Cornelis "Cees" Vervoorn (born 11 April 1960) is a retired swimmer from the Netherlands. He competed at the 1976, 1980 and 1984 Summer Olympics in seven events; in 1980, he finished fourth, sixth and seventh in the 100 m and 200 m butterfly and 4 × 100 m medley relay, respectively. In the 100 m butterfly final, he clocked 55.25, missing the bronze medal by 0.12 s. In the semifinal he swam 55.02, qualifying first for the final.

He won a national title in the 100 m freestyle in 1978 and between 1977 and 1984 set more than 30 national records in various butterfly and freestyle events.

Biography
Vervoorn was born in the Hague, where he completed his secondary education. After spending a year at the Southern Illinois University in the United States, he entered the Vrije Universiteit in Amsterdam (1980–1987). He then worked as a swimming coach and lector in Shanghai, China. In 1992 he defended a PhD on the "Neuro-endocrine aspects of exercise and training" at the Utrecht University. Meanwhile, he was the national swimming coach at the 1984, 1988 and 1992 Olympics and the head of the Dutch Paralympics Team in 1996 and 2000 (he is not handicapped). Between 1992 and 1999 he was heading the top sport division at the Dutch Olympic Committee. In 1999 he became director of the Academy of Physical Education (Academie voor Lichamelijke Opvoeding). Since 2010 he works as a lecturer in top sport. Vervoorn was member of Sportraad Amsterdam.

Selected publications

References

1960 births
Living people
Dutch male butterfly swimmers
Dutch male freestyle swimmers
Olympic swimmers of the Netherlands
Swimmers at the 1976 Summer Olympics
Swimmers at the 1980 Summer Olympics
Swimmers at the 1984 Summer Olympics
Utrecht University alumni
Swimmers from The Hague